Slavko Vukšić (born 24 March 1949) is a Croatian politician and businessman. He is the leader of the minor regional political party the Democratic Party of Slavonia Plain.

Vukšić was born in Šaptinovci near Đurđenovac. In 1983 he graduated from a Zagreb polytechnic school as a safety engineer. Between 1973 and 1987 he worked for INA, when he switched to being a small businessman doing auto-transport and construction. Since 1993 he is the majority owner and director of the company "Kamenolom Gradac d.d." which operates stone-mining and various construction works.

Between 1996 and 2000 he was a member of the Croatian Parliament, elected in the 1995 Croatian parliamentary election under the banner of the Slavonia-Baranja Croatian Party. He also served as a deputy mayor of the town of Našice between 2005 and 2009.

He was a candidate on the 2009-2010 Croatian presidential election, supported by 12,500 signatures submitted to the electoral commission on November 16, 2009. He came in last out of 12 candidates winning 8,309 votes or 0.42% of the vote.

References

External links
 Slavko Vukšić presidential campaign page 

1949 births
Living people
Representatives in the modern Croatian Parliament
Slavonia-Baranja Croatian Party politicians
Candidates for President of Croatia